Cristina Casandra, née Iloc (born 1 February 1977 in Zalău) is a Romanian long-distance runner who specializes mainly in the 3000 metres steeplechase. She took up the event in 2000, having initially specialized in the 5000 metres.

She was the bronze medallist at the Balkan Cross Country Championships in March 2011.  She finished 5th at the 2008 Summer Olympics, but did not reach the final at the 2012 Summer Olympics.

Achievements

Personal bests
3000 metres - 9:02.94 min (2001)
3000 metres steeplechase - 9:16.85 min (2008)
5000 metres - 15:22.64 min (1999)

References

1977 births
Living people
People from Zalău
Romanian female long-distance runners
World record setters in athletics (track and field)
Athletes (track and field) at the 2008 Summer Olympics
Athletes (track and field) at the 2012 Summer Olympics
Olympic athletes of Romania
Romanian female steeplechase runners
Universiade medalists in athletics (track and field)
Universiade bronze medalists for Romania
Medalists at the 1999 Summer Universiade
Medalists at the 2003 Summer Universiade